Morning Sun is an unincorporated community in southeastern Israel Township, Preble County, Ohio, United States. The community is part of the Dayton Metropolitan Statistical Area.

History
Morning Sun was platted in 1833. According to tradition, a sunrise which occurred at the time the first settlers were thinking of a suitable name caused this name to be selected. A post office was established at Morning Sun in 1836, and remained in operation until 1948.

Notable persons
Richard Elihu Sloan, the last Governor of Arizona Territory, was born in Morning Sun in 1857.
Rolla Ramsey, an Indiana University Physics Professor and radio electronics pioneer, was born in Morning Sun in 1872.

References

Unincorporated communities in Preble County, Ohio
1833 establishments in Ohio
Populated places established in 1833
Unincorporated communities in Ohio